The 1989 Masters (officially the 1989 Benson & Hedges Masters) was a professional non-ranking snooker tournament that took place between 22 and 29 January 1989 at the Wembley Conference Centre in London, England. The prize money for the highest break was £6,000. The top 16 players were invited for the tournament.

Stephen Hendry won the Masters at his first attempt after joining the top 16 by defeating John Parrott 9–6 in the final. This was Hendry's first of his five consecutive Masters titles.

The tournament was rocked by a scandal after the first round match between Silvino Francisco and Terry Griffiths on 23 January. After Griffiths beat Francisco 5–1, it was discovered that there had been heavy betting on that exact score. Both players were questioned. Francisco was arrested exactly a year later concerning the 1989 Masters and the 1986 Masters, where he lost 5–1 in the first round to Tony Knowles. In May 1990 he was cleared of involvement in the alleged betting coups.

Field
Steve Davis, defending champion and World Champion was the number 1 seed. The remaining places were allocated to players based on the world rankings. Peter Francisco, Stephen Hendry and Cliff Wilson were making their debuts in the Masters.

Main draw

Final

Century breaks
Highest break; £6,000, Total: 3
 119, 114  Stephen Hendry
 102  Steve Davis

References 

Masters (snooker)
Masters
Masters (snooker)
Masters (snooker)